Chitaporn Kamlangmak (born March 17, 1996, in Chaiyaphum) is a Thai indoor volleyball player. She is a current member of the Thailand women's national volleyball team.

Career
She is on the list 2019 Korea-Thailand all star super match competition.

Clubs 
  Idea Khonkaen (2013–2014)
  Sisaket (2014–2015)
  Thai-Denmark Nong Rua (2015–2016)
  Khonkaen Star (2016–2020)
  Nakhon Ratchasima (2020–2021)
  Kurobe AquaFairies (2021–)

Awards

Individuals
 2015 CH7 University Championship – "Best Blocker"
 2016 CH7 University Championship – "Best Middle Blocker"

References

External links
 FIVB Biography

1996 births
Living people
Chitaporn Kamlangmak
Chitaporn Kamlangmak
Asian Games medalists in volleyball
Volleyball players at the 2018 Asian Games
Chitaporn Kamlangmak
Medalists at the 2018 Asian Games
Chitaporn Kamlangmak